Thomas Hilger is a former West German slalom canoeist who competed from the mid-1980s to the mid-1990s. He won a bronze medal in the K-1 team event at the 1989 ICF Canoe Slalom World Championships in Savage River.

References

German male canoeists
Living people
Year of birth missing (living people)
Medalists at the ICF Canoe Slalom World Championships